Peter Goddard (born 28 June 1964) is a former Grand Prix motorcycle road racer. He resides in Wollongong, New South Wales, Australia. Riding motorcycles since the age of 5, Goddard started his racing career on dirt tracks before making his debut on road circuits at Oran Park Raceway in 1984.

Dirt track racing career 
1982:
1st Australian 125 Dirt-Track Championship, Launceston
2nd Australian 250 Dirt-Track Championship, Launceston	

1986:
1st Australian 250 Dirt-Track Championship, Maryborough
1st Australian 250 Track Championship, Port Pirie
1st Australian 500 Dirt-Track Championship, Port Pirie

Road racing career 

Road Race debut: 1984, Oran Park, New South Wales, Australia

World Superbike Debut: 1989, Oran Park, Australia

World Superbike Wins: 2 (Oran Park, Australia 1989; Phillip Island, Australia 1990) 
500cc GP Debut: 1990 Australian Grand Prix, Phillip Island

500cc GP Starts: 17 (1990–97)  
Best 500cc GP Result: 5th, British Grand Prix, Donington Park, 1992

2002 Race Team Benelli Sport (World Superbike Championship) 
2001 Race Team Benelli Sport (World Superbike Championship) 
2000 Race Team Kawasaki (British & World Superbike Championships) 
1999 Race Team:  Aprilia Racing Team (World Superbike Championship) 
1998 Race Team:  WSBK Suzuki (World Superbike Championship) 
1997 Race Team: Suzuki Endurance Racing Team (World Endurance C'ship)
1st	FIM Endurance World Championship
1994–96 Race Team: Team Ansett Air Freight Suzuki (Superbikes - Australia)
1st	Australian Superbike Championship
1st	Shell Superbike Series
1st	Australian Superbike Championship
1993 Race Team:  Lucky Strike Suzuki (All-Japan 500cc Championship)
1st	All-Japan 500cc Championship
1992 Race Team:  Valvoline ROC-Yamaha (500cc world championship)
1st 500cc World Championship
1991 Race Team:  Team Hayashi Yamaha (All-Japan 500cc Championship)
1st	All-Japan 500cc Championship 
1989–90 Race Team:  Marlboro Yamaha Dealer Team (Superbikes - Australia)
2nd	Australian Superbike Championship
1st	Australian Superbike Championship
1988 Race Team:  Moriwaki (All-Japan Formula One Championship)

CAREER   
1996 1st, Australian Superbike Championship,  
1996 1st, Shell Superbike Series (Australia), 
1997 1st, World Endurance championship

Notable references 

He is the second cousin of mining engineer Shane Lutze.
Mark Murray radiographed his great toe in Deniliquin. Peter was en route to Japan at the time.

References
Peter Goddard career statistics at MotoGP.com
Peter Goddard career World Superbike statistics at worldsbk.com

Australian motorcycle racers
500cc World Championship riders
Superbike World Championship riders
Sportsmen from New South Wales
Living people
1964 births